Milan Bakeš (born January 26, 1963 in Chrudim) is a Czech sport shooter. He competed in rifle shooting events in the Summer Olympics in 1992 and 1996.

Olympic results

References

1963 births
Living people
People from Chrudim
ISSF rifle shooters
Czech male sport shooters
Shooters at the 1992 Summer Olympics
Shooters at the 1996 Summer Olympics
Olympic shooters of Czechoslovakia
Olympic shooters of the Czech Republic
Sportspeople from the Pardubice Region